London Protocol can refer to one of many treaties signed in London, England:

Treaties 
Eight Articles of London (1814), secret protocol awarding the territory of modern Belgium and the Netherlands to William I of the Netherlands
London Protocol (1828), statement of war aims of European powers in Greek War of Independence
London Protocol (1829), amendment of protocol of 1828 expanding Greek borders
London Protocol (1830), recognized Greece as an independent, sovereign state
London Protocol (1832), ratified and reiterated terms of Treaty of Constantinople
London Protocol (1852), altered succession of duchies of Schleswig and Holstein to maintain personal union with Denmark
London Protocol (1862), reiterated terms of Anglo-Japanese Treaty of Amity and Commerce
London Protocol (1877), British pledge of neutrality in Russo-Turkish War in exchange for limitation of Russian war aims
London Protocol (1944), Allied agreement to divide Nazi Germany into three occupation zones after World War II
London Convention on the Prevention of Marine Pollution by Dumping of Wastes and Other Matter (1972), international agreement limiting dumping of hazardous waste at sea
London Agreement (2000), reduced requirements to translate patents granted under European Patent Convention

Other uses 
London Protocol (2004), protocol established at Imperial College London for responding to clinical incidents

See also 
 London Agreement (disambiguation)
 London Declaration (disambiguation)
 List of conferences in London
 Treaty of London (disambiguation)

London-related lists
Lists of treaties